Io sono nato libero (translated from Italian to "I Was Born Free") is the third studio album by Italian progressive rock band Banco del Mutuo Soccorso. "Non mi rompete" and "La città sottile" were released as singles in 1973.

Track listing

Music by Vittorio Nocenzi except (3) by Gianni Nocenzi. Lyrics by Francesco Di Giacomo and Vittorio Nocenzi.

Personnel

 Vittorio Nocenzi – Organ, synths, spinet
 Gianni Nocenzi – Piano, electric piano
 Marcello Todaro – Electric guitar, acoustic guitar
 Renato D'Angelo – bass, acoustic guitar
 Pier Luigi Calderoni – drums, percussion
 Francesco Di Giacomo – vocals

Guest musicians

 Rodolfo Maltese – Acoustic and electric guitar
 Silvana Aliotta – Percussion
 Bruno Perosa – Percussion

References

1973 albums
Banco del Mutuo Soccorso albums